The 1969 Air Canada Silver Broom, the men's world curling championship, was held at the Perth Ice Rink in Perth, Scotland.

Teams

Standings

Results

Draw 1

Draw 2

Draw 3

Draw 4

Draw 5

Draw 6

Draw 7

Playoffs

Semifinal

Final

References

External links
 Video:  (YouTube-channel "Curling Canada")

World Men's Curling Championship
Air Canada Silver Broom
Air Canada Silver Broom, 1969
Sport in Perth, Scotland
International curling competitions hosted by Scotland
Air Canada Silver Broom